In biology, a lerp is a structure of crystallized honeydew produced by larvae of psyllid bugs as a protective cover. These animals are commonly referred to as lerp insects, of which there are over 300 species in Australia.

Lerps are energy rich, consisting mostly of starch, with some proteins and fats. They are eaten by flying foxes, possums and birds such as pardalotes and honeyeaters.

The word is derived from the Wemba Wemba word lerep. Lerps were traditionally eaten by Indigenous people, and could be stored as dry balls for future use.

External links 
 University of California Integrated Pest Management
 University of California Center for Biological Control
 Lerp Psyllid resources provided by Pacific Coast Arborists and Consultants

References

Insect ecology
Insects as food
Psyllidae